Arhopala acetes is a butterfly endemic to Sulawesi described by William Chapman Hewitson in 1862.

References

External links
 "Butterflies of Southeastern Sulawesi". Systematics of Neotropical Butterflies at the University of Florida

Arhopala
Butterflies described in 1862
Taxa named by William Chapman Hewitson
Butterflies of Indonesia